Deh Nesa may refer to:
 Deh Nesa-ye Olya
 Deh Nesa-ye Sofla